Cyllamyces is a fungal genus in the family Neocallimastigaceae. This is a monotypic genus, containing the single species Cyllamyces aberensis.

References

External links

Neocallimastigomycota
Monotypic fungi genera